Nationality words link to articles with information on the nation's poetry or literature (for instance, Irish or France).

Events
 January 28 - Burmese poets Nawrahta Minsaw and Hsinbyushin Medaw become king and queen consort of Lanna
 Italian poet Torquato Tasso is confined in the Ospedale di Sant'Anna in Ferrara as insane; he remains here until 1586.

Works published

Great Britain
Thomas Churchyard, A lamentable and pitifull Description of the  warres in Flanders, including two poems (see also his The Miserie of Flaunders, Calamite of Fraunce, Misfortune of Portugall, Unquietnes of Ireland, Troubles of Scotlande: and the Blessed State of Englande 1579)
 Anthony Munday, The Mirrour of Mutabilitie, or Principall Part of the Mirrour for Magistrates
 Edmund Spenser, writing as "Immerto", The Shepheardes Calender, many editions

Other
 Philippe Desportes, an edition of his works; France
 Catherine Des Roches, also known as "Catherine Fradonnet", Oeuvres, Paris: Abel L'Angelier published this year and in 1578, France
 Giovanni Viperano, De poetica libri tres, Antwerp (criticism)

Births
 March 24 – Tirso de Molina (died 1648), Spanish Baroque dramatist and poet
 August 1 – Luis Vélez de Guevara (died 1644), Spanish dramatist, poet and novelist
 September 16 – Samuel Coster (died 1665), Dutch playwright and poet
 December 20 (bapt.) – John Fletcher (died 1625), English playwright and poet
 Arthur Johnston (died 1641), Scottish poet and physician
 Rhys Prichard (died 1644), Welsh language poet and Anglican vicar

Deaths
 September 28 – Márton Rakovszky (born 1535), Slovak poet and scholar
 November 21 – Cipriano Piccolpasso (born 1524), Italian poet and author

See also

 Poetry
 16th century in poetry
 16th century in literature
 Dutch Renaissance and Golden Age literature
 Elizabethan literature
 French Renaissance literature
 Renaissance literature
 Spanish Renaissance literature

Notes

16th-century poetry
Poetry